Kyle Jacob Stowers (born January 2, 1998) is an American professional baseball outfielder for the Baltimore Orioles of Major League Baseball (MLB). He made his MLB debut in 2022.

Amateur career 
Stowers attended Christian High School in El Cajon, California, and Stanford University, where he played college baseball for the Stanford Cardinal. In 2018, he played collegiate summer baseball with the Falmouth Commodores of the Cape Cod Baseball League and was named a league all-star. As a junior in 2019, he batted .303 with nine home runs and 39 RBIs over 55 games. He was drafted by the Baltimore Orioles in the second round of the 2019 Major League Baseball draft.

Professional career 
Stowers made his professional debut with the Aberdeen IronBirds. He did not play a minor league game in 2020 because the season was cancelled due to the COVID-19 pandemic. He started 2021 with Aberdeen before being promoted to the Bowie Baysox. He was later promoted to the Norfolk Tides. Over 124 games between the three teams, he slashed .278/.383/.514 with 27 home runs and 85 RBIs. After the season, he played in the Arizona Fall League for the Mesa Solar Sox. Stowers started the season with Triple-A Norfolk.

Stowers made his major-league debut as the starting left fielder batting eighth in an 11–1 loss to the Toronto Blue Jays at Rogers Centre on June 13, 2022. His only hit in three at bats was an opposite-field, seventh-inning double off Julian Merryweather that drove in Adley Rutschman with the Orioles' lone run. He and Rico Garcia had been promoted from the Norfolk Tides earlier that day as substitutes for Anthony Santander and Keegan Akin who were both placed on the restricted list for having been unvaccinated against COVID-19 at the time.

Stowers replaced Brett Phillips on the team's 40-man roster when his contract was selected from the Tides two months later on August 19. His first-ever MLB home run was a two-out 0–2 pitch off Liam Hendriks which he sent to the bleachers in center field in the bottom of the ninth to tie at 3–3 an eventual eleven-inning 4–3 Orioles victory over the Chicago White Sox at Camden Yards six days later on August 25. Two pitches earlier, he had hit what was a potential game-ending foul out down the left-field line which was muffed by Adam Engel.

References

External links

Stanford Cardinal bio

1998 births
Living people
Sportspeople from El Cajon, California
Baseball players from California
Major League Baseball outfielders
Baltimore Orioles players
Stanford Cardinal baseball players
Falmouth Commodores players
Aberdeen IronBirds players
Bowie Baysox players
Norfolk Tides players
Mesa Solar Sox players